Ngan Cheuk Pan (born 22 January 1998) is a Hong Kong professional footballer who currently plays as a midfielder for Hong Kong Premier League club Kitchee.

Amateur career
Ngan joined Kitchee's academy in 2008. 

In 2017, Ngan chose to play collegiately for MidAmerica Nazarene. 2 years later, he transferred to St. Bonaventure for his junior season.

Professional career
In July 2015, Ngan was promoted to the first team of Kitchee. He made his HKPL debut for the club on 9 January 2016 in a match against Pegasus.

In July 2017, Ngan left the club to pursue his studies in the US.

On 2 July 2020, Kitchee announced an agreement for Ngan to join in November in the same year.

Career statistics

Club

Notes

Honours

Club
Kitchee
 Hong Kong League Cup: 2015–16
 Hong Kong Senior Challenge Shield: 2016–17
 Hong Kong FA Cup: 2016–17
 Hong Kong Premier League: 2016–17, 2019–20

References

External links

 Profile at HKFA

 
1998 births
Living people
Hong Kong people
Hong Kong footballers
Association football midfielders
Hong Kong Premier League players
Hong Kong First Division League players
Kitchee SC players